Sophia Hammons (born November 16, 2006) is an American actress best known for her roles as Amy in the Disney Channel Film's Under Wraps & Under Wraps 2 and her role as Celeste in the Hulu original Up Here.

References

American actresses
21st-century women
2006 births
Child actors
Living people
People from South Pasadena, California
Actors from California